Cynthia Bolbach (December 27, 1947December 12, 2012) was the Moderator of the 219th General Assembly of the Presbyterian Church (U.S.A.). Bolbach was elected as Moderator on July 3, 2010 from a field of six candidates. Of the candidates, Bolbach was the only Elder and the only one to express unqualified support for same-sex marriage.  She succeeded Rev. Bruce Reyes-Chow and ended her term as moderator upon election of her successor, Rev. Neal D. Presa, at the 220th General Assembly on June 30, 2012.  She received 30 percent of the vote on the first ballot and, after three additional ballots, clinched the election with 53 percent of the vote.

In addition to her duties as Moderator, Bolbach was a lawyer and legal publishing company executive in Washington, D.C.  She was also one of the co-moderators of the new Form of Government (the Constitution) Task Force of the Presbyterian Church (U.S.A.).  Bolbach died peacefully on December 12, 2012 after a year-long battle with cancer.

External links and references

1947 births
2012 deaths
American Presbyterians
People from Washington, D.C.
20th-century American women lawyers
20th-century American lawyers
21st-century American women